Martha J. Kanter is the former Under Secretary of Education. She was appointed by President Barack Obama on April 29, 2009, and confirmed by the Senate on June 19, 2009.

She served as chancellor of the Foothill–De Anza Community College District and established the first program for students with learning disabilities at San Jose City College. In 2007, she additionally founded the Community College Consortium for Open Educational Resources (CCCOER), which promotes the awareness and adoption of open educational policies, practices, and resources. Kanter has a Bachelor of Arts from Brandeis University, a Master of Education from Harvard University, and a Doctor of Education from the University of San Francisco.

As the US Under Secretary of Education, Kanter oversaw policies, programs, and activities related to post-secondary education, vocational and adult education, and federal student aid, as well as continue to promote open educational resources (OER). Kanter announced on August 13, 2013, she would be stepping down from her Obama administration post.

She currently leads College Promise, American non-partisan non-profit initiative to increase college access, affordability, quality, and completion in American higher education. She also is a senior fellow at New York University’s Steinhardt Institute for Higher Education Policy. The College Promise initiative was started in Obama Administration in  2015.

References

General references

External links 
 Biography of Martha Kanter
 Martha Kanter - Distinguished Visiting Professor of Higher Education and Senior Fellow
 with Martha J. Kanter
 Kanter Joins the Exodus
 Martha Kanter 'dispatched to Corvallis with $17 million' to save Craig Robinson's job?
 Dr. Martha Kanter: #ACPArethink Presidential Symposium
 Martha J. Kanter

Year of birth missing (living people)
Living people
Brandeis University alumni
Harvard Graduate School of Education alumni
University of San Francisco alumni
United States Department of Education officials
Obama administration personnel